Perunnelli Krishnan Vaidyar (1863-1894) was follower and a friend to Sree Narayana Guru and a Malayalam poet from the state of Kerala. He was born in an Ezhava family of central Travancore. He belonged to an era called Venmani School of Malayala Literature.

References

Narayana Guru